"Short Skirt/Long Jacket" is the first single by American alternative rock band Cake from their 2001 album Comfort Eagle.

Lyrics and background
The lyrics begin to describe an ideal fantasy woman, beginning with the simple desire for a woman with a short skirt and a long jacket, but then the descriptions go on to become much more elaborate and very specific, as if to tell a story about a particular woman.

John McCrea said the song was "about prosperity and depression" and the strange behavior of the human mating ritual.

During the verses of Short Skirt/Long Jacket, the band plays a variation of the chord structure from The Velvet Underground's "Sweet Jane".

Music video
The associated music vox pop video is composed entirely of people listening to the song on headphones and their reactions. Responses include enthusiasm, critique, and apathy; some dance, while one Ralph Walbridge, poet, gives the headphones back partway through, stating "uh... I've heard it all a million times, all the way back to all of the old records - which were much better - when they first came out, back in the 1940s." Other comments include Dr. Bruce L. Thiessen's (aka Dr. B.L.T.) "as a psychologist, I'd have to say it has therapeutic value because it releases something deep inside". The video was nominated for Breakthrough Video at the 2002 MTV Video Music Awards, but the White Stripes ultimately secured the award.

MuchMusic released an official "Canadian" version of the video that uses footage of people in Toronto, Vancouver, and Montreal. The video humorously censors some foreign words spoken by non-English speakers due to the words' strange pronunciations.

There were various versions of this music video. Additional versions were filmed after the record company suggested the first video would not hold up well to repeated viewing. The videos filmed for an estimated cost of less than $20,000. The Mexican version was directed by Alejandro "Chicle" and edited by Alejandro Davalos Cantu.

Track listing

Charts

Certifications

Covers
 Hugh Sheridan covered this song on his 2009 debut album, Speak Love.

Uses in other media
 A 30 second mostly instrumental edit of "Short Skirt/Long Jacket" is used as the theme music for the NBC series Chuck.
 "Short Skirt/Long Jacket" was used in the film Waitress starring Keri Russell, Nathan Fillion, and Andy Griffith.
 The instrumental section (similar to its usage in Chuck) was used in the films All About Steve,  The Change Up, and Date Night.
 Apple used the song in an advertisement for their 6th generation iPod nano.
 "Short Skirt/Long Jacket" was used in the 2001 episode of the TV series ER titled "Blood, Sugar, Sex, Magic".
 "Short Skirt/Long Jacket" was used in a Fastrack commercial for Summer Bags.
 "Short Skirt/Long Jacket" is a playable song in the video game Rock Band 4.
 "Short Skirt/Long Jacket" is used in a series of split tracks on the electronic card mixing game DropMix by Hasbro.
 "Short Skirt/Long Jacket" was used in relation to New Zealand Social Welfare Clerk Christine Rankin when in 2001 she lost a high-profile Employment Court case after the Labour government decided not to renew her contract,  with allegations of extravagant spending, management style and choice of wardrobe

References

External links
 

2001 singles
Cake (band) songs
Chuck (TV series)
Comedy television theme songs
Television drama theme songs
2001 songs
Songs written by John McCrea (musician)
Columbia Records singles